Hari Punja, OF, OBE (born 1936) is an Indo-Fijian businessman and Chairman of Hari Punja Group of Companies. Hari Punja and Sons Limited is a very diversified (and probably the largest) company in Fiji.

Hari Punja was born in Cuvu, Sigatoka, Fiji and received his education in Fiji and Australia. He trained as a chemical engineer. Punja joined the business in 1960. He has served as a mayor of Lautoka and on a number of prestigious boards such as Fiji Broadcasting Commission and Fiji Sugar Corporation. He served as a Senator from 1996 to 1999.

Following the passage of the Media Industry Development Decree 2010 by the military regime, Punja resigned from the board of Fiji Television and sold his stake in radio company Communications Fiji Limited.

Honors
Punja has been bestowed with many credentials and honors. Some of these include:

 Order of the British Empire (OBE)
 Justice of the Peace (JP)
 Order of Fiji: Bestowed by the President of Fiji, Ratu Sir Kaisese Mara
 The Fiji National Millennium Committee recognized Hari Punja as an outstanding contributor in shaping the nation of Fiji during the 20th Century
 He was named as one of the 10 most successful businessmen living outside India in "The Encyclopedia of the Indian Diaspora" (2006) by Professor Dr. Brij Lal (Australian National University)
 Punja was rated the 6th most influential person in the Pacific region through a poll carried out by the Australian-based Pacific Magazine.

References

Fijian businesspeople
Chemical engineers
1936 births
Living people
Officers of the Order of Fiji
Indian members of the Senate (Fiji)
Fijian engineers
Fijian people of Indian descent
Politicians from Lautoka
Politicians from Sigatoka